Peelwood is a locality in the Upper Lachlan Shire, New South Wales, Australia.

References

Upper Lachlan Shire
Localities in New South Wales